Pomona (minor planet designation: 32 Pomona) is a stony main-belt asteroid that is  in diameter. It was discovered by German-French astronomer Hermann Mayer Salomon Goldschmidt on October 26, 1854, and is named after Pōmōna, the Roman goddess of fruit trees.

Photometric observations of this asteroid gave a light curve with a synodic rotation period of 9.448 hours. The data was used to construct a model for the asteroid, revealing it to be an angular object that is spinning about a pole with ecliptic coordinates (β, λ) = (+58°, 267°). The ratio of the major to minor axes' lengths is roughly equal to 1.3.

The spectrum of 32 Pomona matches an S-type in the Tholen classification system, and is similar to primitive achondrite meteorites. Measurements of the thermal inertia of 32 Pomona give a value of around 20–120 m−2 K−1 s−1/2, compared to 50 for lunar regolith and 400 for coarse sand in an atmosphere.

Observations
Australian amateur astronomer Jonathan Bradshaw recorded an unusual asteroid occultation by 32 Pomona on 16 August 2008. The expected maximum duration of the occultation was 7.1 secs; however, the video recording shows two separate occultations of equal depth each lasting 1.2 seconds, separated by 0.8 secs. Those durations convert to chord lengths at the asteroid of 15 km, 10 km, and 15 km – for a total length of 40 km. The IRAS diameter for Pomona is 80.8 ± 1.6 km. The most likely explanation for this observation is that the asteroid is either binary (including a contact binary), or is a unitary asteroid with a significant concave region on its surface. The video of this occultation can be viewed on YouTube.

References

External links
 
 

Background asteroids
Pomona
Pomona
S-type asteroids (Tholen)
S-type asteroids (SMASS)
18541026